The Friern Barnet & District Local History Society is a group devoted to the history of the Friern Barnet area of North London and its neighbouring areas of North Finchley, New Southgate, Whetstone, and South Friern. The society was formed in 1990 by John Donovan, who lived in the area for nearly 30 years. The first public meeting was held at the former Friern Barnet Town Hall in September 2000. The society sponsors the Friern Barnet Photo Archive.

Publications
 Friern Barnet Library: A Brief History
 Friern Barnet Town Hall: A Brief History
 Gaumont, North Finchley: A Brief History
 New Southgate: A Brief History
 New Southgate Gas Works: A Brief History

References

External links 

Friern Barnet
Historical societies of the United Kingdom
History of the London Borough of Barnet
History of Middlesex
Organisations based in the London Borough of Barnet